Finding Me: Truth is a 2011 drama film directed by Roger S. Omeus Jr. It is a sequel to the 2009 Finding Me.

Plot
A year later, Faybien has been keeping in touch with Lonnie by writing him numerous letters, updating him on what's been going on with he and his friends. He never receives a letter in return, assuming that Lonnie has moved on. Faybien's life has changed as he has ended his dead end job at the mall. As for his friends, Amera and Greg, their lives have changed as well. Amera has found love with her boyfriend of four months, Gabe, and awaits the release of her new album. Unfortunately, Greg has lost his job and has trouble finding employment. To ease the employment woes, he has entered a blossoming relationship with Reggie Hunt, a struggling medical student, and a "sex only" arrangement with Tammy Jones, unbeknownst to Amera, Tammy's cousin.

Cast
 RayMartell Moore as Faybien Allen
 Derrick L. Briggs as Lonnie Wilson
 J'Nara Corbin as Amera Jones
 Eugene E. Turner as Greg Marsh
 Maurice Murrell as Jaylen 'Jay' Timber
 Ron DeSuze as Wilmar Allen
 Eric Joppy as Reggie Hunt

Reception
WBOC-TV gave the film a positive review and commented that it was "fun and funny, a finger-snapping, dulcetly down-low, romantic comedy."

References

External links
 

2011 films
African-American LGBT-related films
African-American drama films
American LGBT-related films
2011 drama films
LGBT-related drama films
2011 LGBT-related films
2010s English-language films
2010s American films